William Starkey may refer to:
William Starkey (pilot boat), a pilot boat in Boston Harbor
 William Starkey, one of the founders of the Boston Marine Society
Billy Starkey, character in The Stand
Bill Starkey, co-founder of Kiss Army, the official fan club for the American rock band Kiss